1943 The Hartlepools by-election was held on 1 June 1943.  The by-election was held due to the death of the incumbent Conservative MP, William George Howard Gritten.  It was won by the Conservative candidate Thomas George Greenwell, who was not opposed by a Liberal or a Labour candidate due to the war time electoral truce where the main parties pledged not to oppose each other's candidates until the end of the Second World War.

References

1943 elections in the United Kingdom
1943 in England
20th century in County Durham
Politics of the Borough of Hartlepool
By-elections to the Parliament of the United Kingdom in County Durham constituencies